Ross Fergusson (born 1 April 1997) is a Scottish professional footballer, who plays as a striker for Annan Athletic. Fergusson has previously played for Queen of the South.

Career
After leaving Heston Rovers, Fergusson joined the Queen of the South 
under 20's development squad, where he played until the end of May 2015. Fergusson made his first-team debut for Queens on 15 October 2016 versus Greenock Morton, appearing as a substitute in a 5–0 defeat.

On 24 November 2017, Fergusson joined Annan Athletic on an emergency loan until 31 December 2017. Fergusson played in six league matches and scored one goal for the Galabankies before returning to the Doonhamers on 4 January 2018.

On 20 January 2018, Fergusson scored his first goal for Queens at Palmerston Park in a 2–1 defeat versus Partick Thistle in the fourth round of the Scottish Cup.

On 8 May 2018, Fergusson extended his contract to remain with the Palmerston club until the end of the 2018-19 season.

On 4 July 2018, Fergusson was released from his contract with Queen of the South by mutual consent.

On 21 July 2018, Fergusson signed a one-year contract with Annan Athletic.

Career statistics

References

External links
 
 

1997 births
Living people
Scottish footballers
Association football midfielders
Queen of the South F.C. players
Scottish Professional Football League players
Footballers from Dumfries
Annan Athletic F.C. players